Drago "Mišo" Smajlović (born 28 October 1938) is a Bosnian retired professional football manager and former player.

Playing career

Club
Smajlović began his career in Sloga, a small amateur club from Sarajevo. In 1955 he moved to the youth team of Željezničar. Two years later, Smajlović signed a professional contract with Željezničar  for whom he played more than 400 games and scored 241 goals. He was handed his debut by Miroslav Brozović. If considering only official matches, he played 190 games and scored 97 goals (with 88 goals in 166 league matches). Smajlović was the top goalscorer of the 1962–63 Yugoslav First League season with 18 goals.

In 1967, he went abroad to Belgium to play at Standard Liège. After a season and a half in Belgium, Smajlović returned to Yugoslavia and continued playing for Olimpija Ljubljana and Čelik Zenica after which he ended his professional playing career.

International
Smajlović was a fine striker, one of the best in Yugoslavia at the time. He played for youth national teams and the "B team", before making his debut for the senior Yugoslav national team in 1963. He collected four caps for Yugoslavia, scoring one goal. His final international was an April 1964 friendly match against Bulgaria.

Smajlović is remembered as a great sportsman. Journalists often called him a gentleman in the football shoes. Unfortunately, the fact that Smajlović did not play for one of the bigger Yugoslav clubs limited his chances of being a regular choice in the national team.

Managerial career
After his playing days were over, Smajlović dedicated himself to a managerial career. In 1988, he was invited to Canada and soon after was named manager of Toronto Croatia in the National Soccer League. Smajlović was the manager of his former club Željezničar on several occasions. He also worked as a sporting director in the club. It is important to say that he was among the responsible ones for saving Željezničar going bankrupt during the Bosnian War.

In 1997, he was elected to be a head coach of the Bosnia and Herzegovina U21 national team. After Faruk Hadžibegić stepped down as senior Bosnia and Herzegovina national team head coach in October 1999, Smajlović was first appointed as a caretaker head coach and several months later, in 2000, he was definitely elected as head coach of the Bosnia and Herzegovina national team. After the end of his contract in 2002, Smajlović never renewed it.

He ultimately decided to end his managerial career after leaving the national team.

Honours

Player
Željezničar 
Yugoslav Second League (West): 1961–62

Čelik Zenica 
Mitropa Cup: 1971–72

Individual
Performance
Yugoslav First League Top Goalscorer: 1962–63 (18 goals)

References

External links

1938 births
Living people
Footballers from Sarajevo
Association football forwards
Bosnia and Herzegovina footballers
Yugoslav footballers
Yugoslavia international footballers
FK Željezničar Sarajevo players
Standard Liège players
NK Olimpija Ljubljana (1945–2005) players
NK Čelik Zenica players
Yugoslav First League players
Yugoslav Second League players
Belgian Pro League players
Yugoslav expatriate footballers
Expatriate footballers in Belgium
Yugoslav expatriate sportspeople in Belgium
Yugoslav football managers
Toronto Croatia managers
Bosnia and Herzegovina football managers
FK Željezničar Sarajevo managers
Bosnia and Herzegovina national under-21 football team managers
Bosnia and Herzegovina national football team managers
Canadian National Soccer League coaches
Yugoslav First League managers
Yugoslav expatriate football managers
Expatriate soccer managers in Canada
Yugoslav expatriate sportspeople in Canada